Gerardo Escobedo Rodríguez (born 10 April 1996) is a Mexican professional footballer who plays as a forward for Chihuahua F.C. He represented Mexico at the 2019 Summer Universiade.

References

External links
 
 

1996 births
Living people
Mexican footballers
Association football forwards
Club Atlético Zacatepec players
Atlético San Luis footballers
UACH F.C. footballers
Cimarrones de Sonora players
Chihuahua F.C. footballers
Liga MX players
Ascenso MX players
Liga Premier de México players
Tercera División de México players
Footballers from Chihuahua
People from Chihuahua City
Competitors at the 2019 Summer Universiade